The Lake Placid Club was a social and recreation club founded 1895, in a hotel on Mirror Lake in Lake Placid, New York, under Melvil Dewey's leadership and according to his ideals. It was instrumental in Lake Placid's development as an internationally known resort.

Early years until Dewey's death (1931)
Dewey intended the club as a place where educators might find health, strength and inspiration at modest cost. Under his leadership, the club became nationally known for winter sports; it built a winter clubhouse in 1907 that allowed year-round visits to Lake Placid.

Starting in the late 1920s, the Club would host a dogsled derby, attracting top competitors like Leonhard Seppala of Fairbanks, Alaska, who won in 1929. The toboggan slides were popular, as well, receiving newspaper coverage from New York City.

Lake Placid Conference
Early in September, 1899, trustees of the Club found the time ripe to bring together those most interested in home science, or household economics.  They sent out many invitations for the first Lake Placid Conference scheduled to take place September 19-25, 1899. One of the attendees, Ellen Swallow Richards, a founder of the modern domestic science movement, was elected chairman of the conference. The conference took place each year from 1899 to 1907.

From 1931 to 1971
The Club had been an active center of skiing ever since the 1910s. Ski-joring as seen in the picture was one of the attractions; ski jumping, ice skating, carnivals and cross-country ski lessons were others. Melvil Dewey's son Godfrey was instrumental in bringing the Winter Olympics to Lake Placid in 1932. Without the club's facilities and its national profile, Lake Placid would not have qualified to host the Games.

In the 1930s, a group of students from the Yale School of Drama performed at the Club's Lakeside Theater during the summer months.

After 1971
Membership declined steadily as vacationing trends among the wealthy changed. Air travel and time constraints meant that fewer families spent the entire season at the Club. In 1977, only 471 families renewed their membership, compared to 711 the previous year. The Club closed soon after serving as headquarters for the International Olympic Committee during the 1980 Winter Olympics in Lake Placid.
During the 1990s the Club was a frequent target for arson and vandalism. Its last main buildings were demolished in January 2002, but some of the cottages, renovated, remain, along with the golf course.

Exclusionary policies 
For most of its existence the Lake Placid Club excluded Jews and other, less powerful groups. A Lake Placid circular explained, "No one will be received as a member or guest against whom there is physical, moral, social or race objection, or who would be unwelcome to even a small minority... This invariable rule is rigidly enforced. It is found impracticable to make exceptions for Jews or others excluded, even though of unusual personal qualifications." Criticism followed in the form of publications and petitions. In 1904, the New York State Board of Regents received a petition demanding Dewey's removal as State Librarian because of his personal involvement in the Lake Placid Club's policy of excluding Jews and other religious and ethnic groups. While the Regents declined to remove Dewey, they did issue a public rebuke. A number of prominent Jewish businessmen published a full-page letter to the Regents in February of 1905; among the signatories were Adolf Ochs of the New York Times and Abraham Abraham (founder of the department store Abraham & Straus). Dewey resigned as Librarian in the summer of 1905 and soon took up permanent residence at the Club, devoting himself to its further development.

In 1954, a New York Times article criticized the Club for its refusal to admit Blacks and Jews. The B'nai B'rith Anti-Defamation League filed a complaint about the Club. The dispute lasted several years, until the League decided to drop the charges of discrimination in 1959. Representatives of the Club claimed that its members were religiously motivated and therefore wished to vacation as Christians among Christians in order to "strengthen their appreciation of and attachment to Christianity." Since Dewey's time, the Club had been very strict about membership, avoiding fashionable vacationers, not serving alcohol in the dining room, and only accepting guests who came recommended by other members. The criteria for membership remained intact until 1976.

Lake Placid Club in Florida

In 1926, Dewey established a southern branch of the club in Lake Stearns, Florida; the town was renamed Lake Placid as a result. It is now owned by the South Florida District of the Church of the Nazarene, which operates it as the Lake Placid Camp and Conference Center.

Dewey made his first trip to Florida in 1926 with his wife, Annie, his son, Godfrey, and C.W. Holt. Dewey chose the "rij", a ridge located in central Florida eighty miles long, two to three miles wide, and one-hundred to three-hundred feet above most of Florida, as the perfect spot for his southern club. The Consolidated Naval Storages Co., and other landowners, offered Dewey 3,048 acres of land on February 18, 1927, and an agreement was made on May 6, 1927. Dewey drafted a town charter which was passed through legislation on July 6, 1927 and signed by Gov. John W. Martin, which defined the borders, approved name changes for the town, lakes, and rivers, and provided for its government. The town name was changed from Lake Stearns to Lake Placid and the Lake Stearns became Lake June-in-Winter and Lake Childs became Lake Placid. A three-story building was constructed consisting of sixty-eight rooms and situated two blocks from the Atlantic Coast Line Railway station and was called Club "Loj" which opened on December 1, 1927, and hosted Dewey's 76th birthday on Dececmber 16, 1927. 

Features of Club Loj included a $12,500 firetruck and a 100,000-gallon water tank, each room had two exits, and a night watchman made routine patrols. The kitchen and entertainment were spared no expense, including tennis and various watersports. The second-year of operation added a ten-car garage and a golf course, and the water works throughout the club was completed. In the third-year, four new buildings, Litlloj, Lyvok (Live Oak), Lakehouse, and Easthouse, began construction and the road to town was paved, and a special train car called "Lake Placid" was added to the Atlantic Coast Line. In year five, the largest building, Club Loj, was closed to save money. 

Dewey died on December 26, 1931 in the Litlloj building. The club was in operation until 1942, and was sold at public auction on October 17, 1942, by order of the Circuit Court of Florida to pay off the mortgage.

References

Bibliography
Ackerman, David H.: Lake Placid Club: An Illustrated History: 1895-1980. Lake Placid Education Foundation, 1998. .
Stansfield, Dean: Images of America. Lake Placid. Charleston, N.C.: Arcadia Publishing, 2002. .
Stedman, Irving L.: Lake Placid Club. Fulton, N.Y.: Morrill Press, 1924

External links
New York Times, Melvil Dewey dead in Florida, December 27, 1931.
Lake Placid Florida's Chamber of Commerce History Site
Home Town Network's History of the Lake Placid Club Florida

Buildings and structures in Essex County, New York
Golf clubs and courses in New York (state)
Resorts in New York (state)
Ski clubs
Demolished buildings and structures in New York (state)
Buildings and structures demolished in 2002